Carex matsumurae is a tussock-forming species of perennial sedge in the family Cyperaceae. It is native to parts of South Korea and Japan.

See also
List of Carex species

References

matsumurae
Taxa named by Adrien René Franchet
Plants described in 1895
Flora of Japan
Flora of South Korea